Dioctophymatidae is a family of nematodes belonging to the order Ascaridida.

Genera:
 Dioctophyma Collet-Meygret, 1802 
 Dioctophyme 
 Eustrongylides
 Hystrichis

References

Nematodes